The flag of Uva, was adopted for the Uva Province of Sri Lanka in 1987.

Symbolism
The flag of the Uva is a red and yellow flag of a bird. It is bordered by a series of patterns.

See also
 Flag of Sri Lanka
 List of Sri Lankan flags

References

External links
 Uva Governor's office
 Flagspot
 Sri Lanka.Asia

Uva
Uva
Uva Province
Uva
Flags displaying animals